172 may refer to:

 The year 172 of the Gregorian calendar
 The number 172 (number)
 The Cessna 172 "Skyhawk", a single engine, high wing, light airplane produced by Cessna Aircraft Company
 172 BC
 British Rail Class 172, a Diesel multiple unit built by Bombardier Transportation part of the Turbostar family in 2010